Laskowice  is a village in the administrative district of Gmina Lasowice Wielkie, within Kluczbork County, Opole Voivodeship, in south-western Poland.

The village has a population of 980.

See also
St. Lawrence's Church, Laskowice

References

Laskowice